Sheinton is a civil parish in Shropshire, England.  It contains nine listed buildings that are recorded in the National Heritage List for England.  Of these, one is listed at Grade II*, the middle of the three grades, and the others are at Grade II, the lowest grade.  The parish contains the village of Sheinton and the surrounding countryside.  Most of the listed buildings are farmhouses, the others being a church, a cottage, a barn, a former mill, and a former rectory.


Key

Buildings

References

Citations

Sources

Lists of buildings and structures in Shropshire